Horsham YMCA is a football club based in Horsham, West Sussex, England.

History
The club was established in 1898. They played in Horsham & District League before joining the Crawley and District Football League. They subsequently moved up to the Mid-Sussex League, where they played until joining Division Two of the Sussex County League in 1959. The club won the Division Two Cup in 1959–60 and 1961–62 before winning the Division Two title in 1965–66, earning promotion to Division One. They went on to win the league's John O'Hara Cup in 1966–67, 1967–68 and 1981–82.

Horsham were relegated to Division Two at the end of the 1981–82 season. However, they won the Division Two title at the first attempt, earning an immediate promotion back to Division One. They were relegated again after finishing bottom of Division One in 1987–88. They won the Division Two Cup in 1994–95, also finishing third in the division to earn promotion back to Division One. The club won Sussex RUR Cup in 2000–01, and the John O'Hara Cup the following season. They won the Division One title in 2004–05, but were denied promotion due to ground grading regulations. However, after winning Division One again the following season and making improvements to their Gorings Mead ground, the club were promoted to Division One South of the Isthmian League.

The 2007–08 season saw Horsham finish in the relegation zone, resulting in relegation back to Division One of the Sussex County League. However, after finishing third in division the following season, they were promoted back to Division One South of the Isthmian League. In 2010–11 the club finished bottom of Division One South and were relegated to the Sussex County League again. In 2015 the league was renamed the Southern Combination, with Division One becoming the Premier Division.

Ground
The club initially played at Lyons Field, named after the Lyons family who owned much land around the town. In 1929 they moved to Gorings Mead, which backed onto Horsham's Queen Street ground. YMCA later purchased the freehold to the site. The ground has a brick-built seated stand with a cantilever roof on one side of the pitch, with its seats taken from the Goldstone Ground, with a covered standing area on the other.

Honours
Southern Combination
Division One champions 2004–05, 2005–06
Division Two champions 1965–66, 1982–83
John O'Hara Cup winners 1966–67, 1967–68, 1981–82, 2001–02
Division Two Cup winners 1959–60, 1961–62, 1994–95
Sussex RUR Cup
Winners 2000–01, 2013–14

Records
Best FA Cup performance: Fourth qualifying round, 1999–2000
Best FA Trophy performance: First qualifying round, 2006–07, 2007–08
Best FA Vase performance: Fourth round, 1999–2000
Record attendance: 950 vs Chelmsford City, FA Cup, 2000

See also
Horsham YMCA F.C. players

References

External links
Official website

Football clubs in England
Football clubs in West Sussex
Association football clubs established in 1898
Horsham
1898 establishments in England
Crawley and District Football League
Mid-Sussex Football League
Southern Combination Football League
Isthmian League
Sports clubs founded by the YMCA